Anthene butleri, the pale hairtail or Butler's ciliate blue, is a butterfly of the family Lycaenidae. It is found from South Africa to Kenya, Uganda, and Ethiopia. In South Africa it is found in coastal lowland forest in KwaZulu-Natal, from the coast to Kosi Bay, inland across the Makathini Flats.

The wingspan is 23–28 mm for males and 25–32 mm for females. Adults are on wing year-round, with a peak in the warmer months.

The larvae feed on Kalanchoe crenata, Kalanchoe lugardii and Cotyledon species, including Cotyledon orbiculata .

Subspecies
A. b. butleri (Ethiopia, southern Sudan, northern Uganda, north-west Kenya)
A. b. arabicus Gabriel, 1954 (Yemen)
A. b. galla Stempffer, 1947 (northern Kenya, southern Ethiopia)
A. b. livida (Trimen, 1881) (Cape, Orange Free State, KwaZulu-Natal, Eswatini, Transvaal, Zimbabwe, Mozambique, Tanzania)
A. b. stempfferi Storace, 1954 (Kenya: central to the Teita Hills, Tanzania)

References

Butterflies described in 1880
Anthene
Butterflies of Africa
Taxa named by Charles Oberthür